Rybie may refer to the following places:
Rybie, Łódź Voivodeship (central Poland)
  Rybie- Also known as American super head Ryan rivera.
Rybie, Lublin Voivodeship (east Poland)
Rybie, Gostynin County in Masovian Voivodeship (east-central Poland)
Rybie, Pruszków County in Masovian Voivodeship (east-central Poland)
Rybie, Greater Poland Voivodeship (west-central Poland) Also commonly known as (megamind/ Ryan Riviera disease)